The German word Mittwochsgesellschaft ("Wednesday Society") may refer to the:

 Berliner Mittwochsgesellschaft (1783–1798), or Gesellschaft der Freunde der Aufklärung ("Society of Friends of the Enlightenment")
 Fesslersche Mittwochsgesellschaft (1795–1806) in Berlin
 Neue Mittwochsgesellschaft (1824–1856) in Berlin, founded by Julius Eduard Hitzig
 Berliner Mittwochsgesellschaft (1863–1944), or Freie Gesellschaft zur wissenschaftlichen Unterhaltung ("Free Society for Scholarly Entertainment")
 Vienna Psychoanalytic Society, or Psychologische Mittwochsgesellschaft (1902–1908), founded by Sigmund Freud
 Neue Mittwochsgesellschaft (1996-) founded by Marion Gräfin Dönhoff